Fabriki im. P. L. Voykova is a rural locality (a settlement) in Murom Urban Okrug, Vladimir Oblast, Russia. The population was 1,383 as of 2010.

Geography 
Fabriki im. P. L. Voykova is located 6 km north of Murom. Dmitriyevskaya Sloboda is the nearest rural locality.

References 

Rural localities in Murom Urban Okrug